Shah Ahmad Shafi (1916 – 18 September 2020) was a Bangladeshi Sunni Islamic scholar, the chief of Hefazat-e-Islam Bangladesh, Rector of Al-Jamiatul Ahlia Darul Ulum Moinul Islam Hathazari and also the chairman of Bangladesh Qawmi Madrasah Education Board. He was born in 1916 (1334-35 AH) in Rangunia, Chittagong and was educated at Hathazari Madrasah and Darul Uloom Deoband.

Early life
He was born in 1916 (1334-35 AH) in Rangunia, Chittagong. He received his primary education from his family. Then he joined Al-Jamiatul Arabiatul Islamiah. He was admitted to Al-Jamiatul Ahlia Darul Ulum Moinul Islam in 1926 (1344-45 AH) at the age of 10. In Hathazari Madrasah he studied for 10 years. Then Shafi went to Darul Uloom Deoband for higher studies in the field of Hadith and Tafsir.

He was a renowned Islamic scholar in Bangladesh.He studied there for four years before returning to his homeland Bangladesh. During his study time at Darul Uloom Deoband he became close to Hussain Ahmed Madani and later he became his youngest official successor from Indian subcontinent. Ahmad Shafi was the leader of Hifazat-E-Islam Bangladesh, (a non-political Islamic organization).

Career
Ahmad Shafi commenced his career as a teacher at Al-Jamiatul Ahlia Darul Ulum Moinul Islam Hathazari, Chittagong (Hathazari Madrasah). In 1986/1987 (1407 AH), he was elected rector (Head of the University Madrasah) of Hathazari Madrasah. Shafi was also the chairman of Bangladesh Qawmi Madrasah Education Board.

Shah Ahmad Shafi was to continue to serve as the director general of  Al-Jamiatul Ahlia Darul Ulum Moinul Islam, also known as Hathazari Madrasa, as decided by Majlis-e-Shura. "No one will be appointed as the acting rector of the madrasa as long as Shafi is alive," Press Secretary of the Hefazat chief, Munir Ahmed said.

Views 

In 2009 (1430 AH), Ahmad Shafi, Azizul Haque, and other Bengali Muslim scholars, in a joint statement to the Prime Minister Sheikh Hasina Wazed, condemned terrorism and militancy committed in the name of Islam.

Controversy

2013 comments 
In 2013, a speech given by Ahmad Shafi at Hathazari, Chittagong was described as highly misogynistic. He reportedly said: "Why are you sending your daughters to work in garment factories?... She goes to work after Fajr at 7/8:00am and does not come back even at 8/10/12 at night... You do not know which man she is hanging out with. You do not know how much zina (fornication) she is getting involved in."

The comments caused outrage among women's rights activists who demanded his imprisonment. Sheikh Hasina, the Prime Minister of Bangladesh termed the statement "disgusting" and "distasteful".

A Political Party Demand that a Relationship with Bangladesh Jamaat-e-Islami 
Although the Awami League described him as a frontman for Bangladesh Jamaat-e-Islami, analysts say this is highly unlikely as Ahmad Shafi belonged to a band of Islamists that unlike Jamaat, did not oppose the independence of Bangladesh, and supported a united India and rejected the creation of Pakistan in 1947.

Death 

He was suffering from various complex diseases of old age including Diabetes and heart disease for years. On 17 September 2020 midnight, Shafi was brought by ambulance from Hathazari Madrasah to Chittagong Medical College Hospital (CMCH) as his physical condition deteriorated. He was later admitted to the 6th bed of the Intensive Care Unit (ICU) on the 3rd floor of the hospital as his pressure and pulse rate decreased.

A medical board was formed on the morning of 18 September 2020, who suggested he should be moved to Dhaka for better treatment. On the advice of doctors, the family members took him to Asgar Ali Hospital in Dhaka by air ambulance at 4.30 pm for better treatment. Hefazat-e-Islam Bangladesh leader Mufti Mohammad Faizullah confirmed that he died at 6pm on Friday. He was 103–104 years old at the time of his death.

Works

Urdu
 Faizu-l-Jaari (Explanation of Bukhari)
 Al-Bayaanu-l-Fasil Baina-l-Haqqi wa-l-Baatil
 Al-Hujaju-l-Qaatiah Li-daf-yin Nahjil Khatiah
 Al-Khairu-l-Katheer Fee Usuli-t-Tafseer
 Islam o Siyaasat
 Izhar-e-Haqeeqat
 Takfeer-e-Muslim
 Chand Raoyejna
 Fuyoozat-e-Ahmadiyah

Bengali
 Haq O Batiler Chiranton Dondo
 Islami Ortho Bebostha
 Islam O Rajniti
 Sotter Dikhe Korun Ahoban
 Sunnat O Bid'ater Sothik Porichoy
 Mukhosh Ummochon
 Qur'aan o Sunnat er Alokay Apnar Namaaj

See also 
 Fazlul Hoque Amini - student of Ahmad Shafi
 Mufti Izharul Islam
 Allama Junaid Babunagari
 Allama Nurul Islam Ulipuri
 Maulana Muhiuddin Khan

References 

1916 births
2020 deaths
Bangladeshi centenarians
Bangladeshi Islamic religious leaders
Bangladeshi Sunni Muslim scholars of Islam
Bengali Muslim scholars of Islam
Bengali writers
Darul Uloom Deoband alumni
Darul Uloom Hathazari Alumni
Deobandis
Director general of Darul Uloom Hathazari
Disciples of Hussain Ahmad Madani
Men centenarians
People from Chittagong District
Shaikhul Hadith of Darul Uloom Hathazari
20th-century Bengalis
21st-century Bengalis
21st-century Urdu-language writers
20th-century Urdu-language writers